Doridostoma is a genus of moths belonging to the subfamily Tortricinae of the family Tortricidae.

Species
Doridostoma denotata Diakonoff, 1973
Doridostoma stenomorpha Diakonoff, 1973
Doridostoma symplecta (Meyrick, 1910)

See also
List of Tortricidae genera

References

 , 2013: An illustrated catalogue of the specimens of Tortricidae in the Iziko South African Museum, Cape Town (Lepidoptera: Tortricidae). Shilap Revista de Lepidopterologia 41 (162): 213–240.

External links
tortricidae.com

Schoenotenini